Masoreus is a genus of ground beetle native to the Palearctic (including Europe), the Near East and North Africa. It contains the following species:

 Masoreus aegyptiacus Dejean, 1821
 Masoreus affinis Chaudoir, 1843
 Masoreus alticola Wollaston, 1864
 Masoreus grandis Zimmermann, 1834
 Masoreus orientalis Dejean, 1828
 Masoreus saharensis Mateu, 1984
 Masoreus wetterhallii Gyllenhal, 1813

References

External links
Masoreus at Fauna Europaea

Lebiinae